Azza is an Arabic feminine given name. Notable people with the given name include:

Princess Azza of Iraq (1905–1960), Iraqi royal
Azza Attoura, Syrian kick boxer
Azza Besbes (born 1990), Tunisian sabre fencer
Azza Fahmy, Egyptian jewellery designer
Azza Filali (born 1952), Tunisian doctor and writer
Azza El-Hassan (born 1971), Palestinian documentary filmmaker, cinematographer, producer and writer
Azza al-Mayla (7th-century–705), Arab poet and musician
Azza Sultan Al-Qasimi (born 1973), Emirati artist and businesswoman
Azza Soliman (born 1966), Egyptian lawyer and women's rights activist

See also
 Azza (disambiguation)
 Mariyam Azza (born 1989), Maldivian film actress

Arabic feminine given names